Fragrant Sense is a 1999 progressive trance album by Los Angeles-based DJ Doran.

Track listing 
 Joshua Ryan - "Pistolwhip" - 8:35
 Jimmy Johnson - "Fear Of Flying" - 6:05
 Deepsky - "Cosmic Dancer (Heads Of State Mix)" - 5:53
 Auratone - "Falling (System 22's Dizzy Mix)" - 4:42
 Sandra Collins - "Ode To Our" - 6:50
 Pure Nova - "Awakening (Christopher Lawrence Mix)" - 6:37
 Joshua Ryan -	"Distance" - 7:04
 Trinity Sight - "Three Mile Highland" - 6:35
 Gyrate - "Escape" - 7:46
 Sandra Collins - "Red" - 6:35
 Deepsky - "Stargazer" - 7:08

References

External links
Doran's official website

1999 albums
Trance albums